Anolis chlorodius, the Pedernales green anole, is a species of lizard in the family Dactyloidae. The species is found in Hispaniola.

References

Anoles
Reptiles of Haiti
Reptiles of the Dominican Republic
Reptiles described in 2016
Taxa named by Gunther Köhler
Taxa named by Stephen Blair Hedges